In mathematics, an infrastructure is a group-like structure appearing in global fields.

Historic development 

In 1972, D. Shanks first discovered the infrastructure of a real quadratic number field and applied his baby-step giant-step algorithm to compute the regulator of such a field in  binary operations (for every ), where  is the discriminant of the quadratic field; previous methods required  binary operations. Ten years later, H. W. Lenstra published a mathematical framework describing the infrastructure of a real quadratic number field in terms of "circular groups". It was also described by R. Schoof and H. C. Williams, and later extended by H. C. Williams, G. W. Dueck and B. K. Schmid to certain cubic number fields of unit rank one and by J. Buchmann and H. C. Williams to all number fields of unit rank one. In his habilitation thesis, J. Buchmann presented a baby-step giant-step algorithm to compute the regulator of a number field of arbitrary unit rank. The first description of infrastructures in number fields of arbitrary unit rank was given by R. Schoof using Arakelov divisors in 2008.

The infrastructure was also described for other global fields, namely for algebraic function fields over finite fields. This was done first by A. Stein and H. G. Zimmer in the case of real hyperelliptic function fields. It was extended to certain cubic function fields of unit rank one by R. Scheidler and A. Stein. In 1999, S. Paulus and H.-G. Rück related the infrastructure of a real quadratic function field to the divisor class group. This connection can be generalized to arbitrary function fields and, combining with R. Schoof's results, to all global fields.

One-dimensional case

Abstract definition 

A one-dimensional (abstract) infrastructure  consists of a real number , a finite set  together with an injective map . The map  is often called the distance map.

Baby steps 

A baby step is a unary operation  on a one-dimensional infrastructure . Visualizing the infrastructure as a circle, a baby step assigns each point of  the next one. Formally, one can define this by assigning to  the real number ; then, one can define .

Giant steps and reduction maps 

To formalize this concept, assume that there is a map ; then, one can define  to obtain a binary operation , called the giant step operation. Note that this operation is in general not associative.

The main difficulty is how to choose the map . Assuming that one wants to have the condition , a range of possibilities remain. This choice, seeming somewhat arbitrary, appears in a natural way when one tries to obtain infrastructures from global fields.

Relation to real quadratic fields 

D. Shanks observed the infrastructure in real quadratic number fields when he was looking at cycles of reduced binary quadratic forms. Note that there is a close relation between reducing binary quadratic forms and continued fraction expansion; one step in the continued fraction expansion of a certain quadratic irrationality gives a unary operation on the set of reduced forms, which cycles through all reduced forms in one equivalence class. Arranging all these reduced forms in a cycle, Shanks noticed that one can quickly jump to reduced forms further away from the beginning of the circle by composing two such forms and reducing the result. He called this binary operation on the set of reduced forms a giant step, and the operation to go to the next reduced form in the cycle a baby step.

Relation to  

The set  has a natural group operation and the giant step operation is defined in terms of it. They used floating point numbers to represent the real numbers, and called these representations CRIAD-representations resp. -representations. More generally, one can define a similar concept for all one-dimensional infrastructures; these are sometimes called -representations.

A set of -representations is a subset  of  such that the map  is a bijection and that  for every . If  is a reduction map,  is a set of -representations; conversely, if  is a set of -representations, one can obtain a reduction map by setting , where  is the projection on $X$. Hence, sets of -representations and reduction maps are in a one-to-one correspondence.

In case one uses the reduction map , one obtains . If the value was negative, one has that  and that , i.e. .

References 

Algebra
Algebraic structures